Brandon Joseph Fremin (born April 9, 1974) is an American attorney who served as the United States Attorney for the Middle District of Louisiana from 2018 to 2021.

Biography
Fremin received his Bachelor of Arts, cum laude, from Southeastern Louisiana University, and his Juris Doctor from the Paul M. Hebert Law Center at Louisiana State University. He enlisted in the United States Marine Corps in 1994, where he served until 2002 when he was honorably discharged as a platoon sergeant.

He previously served as an Assistant District Attorney in the Office of the District Attorney for the 19th Judicial District of Louisiana and as an Assistant United States Attorney in the U.S. Attorney's Office for the Middle District of Louisiana. Prior to his appointment as U.S. Attorney, he served as the Director of the Criminal Division for the Office of the Louisiana Attorney General.

United States Attorney for the Middle District of Louisiana
On November 1, 2017, Fremin was nominated by President Donald Trump to be the next United States Attorney for the Middle District of Louisiana. On February 8, 2018, his nomination was reported out of committee by voice vote. On February 15, 2018, his nomination was confirmed by voice vote. He was sworn into office on February 23, 2018.

On February 8, 2021, he along with 55 other Trump-era attorneys were asked to resign. He submitted his resignation on February 18, effective February 28.

References

External links
 Biography at U.S. Department of Justice

1974 births
Living people
Assistant United States Attorneys
District attorneys in Louisiana
Louisiana State University Law Center alumni
People from Baton Rouge, Louisiana
Southeastern Louisiana University alumni
United States Attorneys for the Middle District of Louisiana
United States Marines
20th-century American lawyers
21st-century American lawyers